Pandu (19 February 1947 – 6 May 2021) was an Indian Tamil actor and graphic designer who appeared in many comedy roles in Tamil cinema. He made his acting debut in the film Maanavan (1970).

A Doctor of Philosophy graduate in arts from France, he was also a visual artist who founded Capital Letters, a graphic designing company. He most notably designed the party symbol and logo of the All India Anna Dravida Munnetra Kazhagam. His brother Idichapuli Selvaraj had also previously appeared in films as a comedian.

Career
After schooling, he first hesitated to pursue Diploma in Arts as it had five-year duration. But after his teacher's insistence, he wrote the entrance exam for Arts & Design and cleared with first class and enrolled in a famous Arts & Design institute at Baroda. He completed his post-graduation at National Institute of Design, Ahmedabad with Government of India scholarship. Again he got a scholarship from Government of India for pursuing his Doctorate Degree in Arts & Design from France. He designed Tamil Nadu Tourism Logo "Umbrella" and got cash prize of Rs.20,000/- (during the 1960s). The painting of Jayalalithaa in the song "Enge Aval, Endre Manam", was drawn by him. He is more passionate in Arts, Design and Paintings rather than Cinema. The Logos of Sun TV, Shankara Nethralaya, etc. were designed by him. More than 250 Logos for reputed Companies/Organizations/firms were designed by him . He designed the two leaves party logo under the instruction and supervision of AIADMK founder leader MGR. In an interview with The Hindu newspaper in 2016, he said that he designed the AIADMK Flag within one hour during night around 10:00 pm and also revealed that his association with late Indian veteran actor turned politician MGR began in 1973 when Pandu had designed stickers for MGR's iconic yesteryear evergreen film Ulagam Sutrum Valiban. Pandu made his acting debut in Maanavan, joining his brother Idichapuli Selvaraj who had appeared in several films as a comedian. He played a supporting role in Agathiyan's Kadhal Kottai portraying Ramasamy who accompanies Ajith Kumar in Rajasthan. The performance as Ajith's sidekick was widely praised and established him as a prominent actor.

In 2013, he starred in Vellachi, which featured his son Pintu Pandu in a leading role.

Away from films, in 1975 he started a brass and aluminium business in Chennai called Prapanj Unlimited. He ran it as a family business, with son Prabhu Panju in charge. He also ran a company called Capital Letters and engaged in designing name boards for offices and residences of Tamil film fraternity. In 2014, he held an art exhibition alongside another son Panju Pandu. His paintings were displayed at various International Exhibitions throughout the world.

Death
He died on 6 May 2021 at the age of 74 after being hospitalized for COVID-19.

Selected filmography

Films

Television
 2007: Dhinam Dhinam Deepavali 
 2014: Uravugal Sangamam
 2015-2016: Sabitha Engira Sabapathi 
 2016: Valli - Natarajan

References

External links
 

1947 births
2021 deaths
Tamil comedians
Male actors from Chennai
Male actors in Tamil cinema
Indian male comedians
Tamil male television actors
20th-century Indian male actors
21st-century Indian male actors
People from Namakkal district
Deaths from the COVID-19 pandemic in India